On June 1, 1990, Presidents George H. W. Bush and Mikhail Gorbachev signed the bilateral U.S.–Soviet Chemical Weapons Accord; officially known as the "Agreement on Destruction and Non-production of Chemical Weapons and on Measures to Facilitate the Multilateral Convention on Banning Chemical Weapons". This pact was signed during a summit meeting in Washington D.C.

Criteria
The bilateral agreement required the destruction to begin before 1993 and to reduce Chemical weapon (CW) stockpiles to no more than 5,000 agent tons each by December 31, 2002. It also required both sides to halt CW production upon entry into force of the accord. Additionally on-site inspections were authorized to confirm that destruction has taken place and data exchanges on stockpile levels would occur to facilitate monitoring. The Accord also included a mutual pledge to support a global ban on CW.

See also
 Chemical warfare
 Chemical Weapons Convention
 List of chemical arms control agreements
 Lethal Unitary Chemical Agents and Munitions
 List of Soviet Union–United States summits
 Novichok agent

References

External links

Arms control treaties
Soviet Union–United States treaties
Chemical weapons demilitarization
Treaties concluded in 1990
Chemical Weapons Accord
Chemical Weapons Accord
Soviet chemical weapons program